A one-night stand is either a non-recurring theatrical performance or a sexual encounter lasting one night.

One-night stand may also refer to:

In film
 One Night Stand (1984 film), a John Duigan film
 One Night Stand (1997 film), a Mike Figgis film
 One Night Stand (2016 film), a Jasmine D'Souza film

In music
 One Night Stand (musical), a musical by Herb Gardner and Jule Styne
 One Night Stand (opera), 2011 opera by Finnish composer Olli Kortekangas
One Night Stand (Gary B.B. Coleman album), 1989
One Night Stand (Flamin' Groovies album), 1987
 "One Night Stand" (Mis-Teeq song), a song by Mis-Teeq
 "One Night Stand" (Keri Hilson song), a song by Keri Hilson and Chris Brown
 "One Nite Stand (Of Wolves and Sheep)", a song by Sarah Connor
"Free Loop (One Night Stand)", a 2005 song by Daniel Powter
 Triple J's One Night Stand, an annual music concert
 "One Night Stand", a song by TWiiNS and Flo Rida
 "One Night Stand", a song by Paul Anka and Wes Farrell
 "One Night Stand", a song by The Aloof from their 1996 album Sinking
 One Night Stand: Ladies Only Tour, a 2008 tour by Usher in support of his album Here I Stand
 "One Night Stand", a song by Keith Moon from his 1975 album Two Sides of the Moon
"One Night Stand", a song by Small Faces from their 1966 album Small Faces
 "One Night Stand", a 2006 song by Motörhead from their album Kiss of Death

In television
 One Night Stand (Grimm), an episode of Grimm
 One Night Stand (CSI episode), an episode of CSI: Miami
 One Night Stand, an episode of Ever Decreasing Circles
 One Night Stand (Canadian TV series), a 1976 Canadian music television series
 One Night Stand (US TV series), a stand-up comedy television series
 Dave's One Night Stand, a British stand-up comedy programme
 WWE One Night Stand (formerly ECW One Night Stand), a pay-per-view wrestling event

Other
 One Night Stand (video game), a video game